The Anschluss Commemorative Medal was a decoration of Nazi Germany awarded during the interwar period, and the first in a series of Occupation Medals.

Description
Instituted on 1 May 1938, the medal commemorated the annexation of Austria by the German Reich, the so-called Anschluss. German troops crossed the Austrian border on 12 March 1938 without any resistance. The medal, known as the "Anschluss medal", was awarded to those, both military and civilian, who contributed to or participated in the annexation. This included German State officials and members of the German Wehrmacht and SS who entered Austria. Local Nazis who had worked for union with Germany also qualified, including the widows of those who had been killed for their cause. Last awarded on 31 December 1940, a total of 318,689 medals were bestowed.

The wearing of Nazi era awards was banned in 1945. The Anschluss medal was not among those awards reauthorized for official wear by the Federal Republic of Germany in 1957.

Design
The circular, highly detailed, die-struck medal was based on the 1938 Party Day Badge and designed by Professor Richard Klein. On the obverse, a man holding the Nazi flag stands on a podium bearing the eagle emblem of the Third Reich; he assists a second man onto the podium, whose right arm bears a broken shackle. This symbolizes Austria's union with the larger Reich. On the reverse is the inscription "13. März 1938" (13 March 1938), the date of the Anschluss. The date is surrounded on the outer edge by the words, "Ein Volk, Ein Reich, Ein Führer" ("One People, One Nation, One Leader"). The medal is suspended from a red ribbon with white-black-white stripes at the edges of the ribbon. It was made of brass or tombac bronze with a silvered matte finish.

See also 
 German Occupation Medals
 Sudetenland Medal
 Memel Medal
Orders, decorations, and medals of Nazi Germany

References

Bibliography

External link
 Wehrmacht Awards: Occupation Medals

Orders, decorations, and medals of Nazi Germany
Austria under National Socialism
Awards established in 1938